Mercedes Carolina Toledo Salazar (born 17 May 1989) is a Venezuelan swimmer. She competed in the women's 200 metre breaststroke event at the 2017 World Aquatics Championships.

References

External links
 

1989 births
Living people
Venezuelan female swimmers
Place of birth missing (living people)
South American Games silver medalists for Venezuela
South American Games bronze medalists for Venezuela
South American Games medalists in swimming
Competitors at the 2018 South American Games
Swimmers at the 2011 Pan American Games
Swimmers at the 2015 Pan American Games
Swimmers at the 2019 Pan American Games
Central American and Caribbean Games gold medalists for Venezuela
Central American and Caribbean Games medalists in swimming
Competitors at the 2014 Central American and Caribbean Games
Female breaststroke swimmers
Pan American Games competitors for Venezuela
20th-century Venezuelan women
21st-century Venezuelan women